Pontomalota is a genus of "sea shore genera" in the beetle family Staphylinidae. There are at least two described species in Pontomalota.

Species
These two species belong to the genus Pontomalota:
 Pontomalota opaca (LeConte, 1863)
 Pontomalota terminalia Ahn & Ashe, 1992

References

Further reading

 
 
 
 
 

Aleocharinae
Articles created by Qbugbot